Jakub Hora (born 23 February 1991) is a Czech professional footballer who plays as a striker for SK Dynamo České Budějovice, on loan from FK Teplice.

External links 
 
 

1991 births
Living people
Czech footballers
Czech expatriate footballers
Czech Republic youth international footballers
Czech Republic under-21 international footballers
Czech National Football League players
Czech First League players
Latvian Higher League players
FK Baník Most players
SK Slavia Prague players
FC Viktoria Plzeň players
SK Dynamo České Budějovice players
Bohemians 1905 players
FK Teplice players
Riga FC players
Podbeskidzie Bielsko-Biała players
Sportspeople from Most (city)
Association football forwards
Expatriate footballers in Latvia
Expatriate footballers in Poland